Luxton is a surname. Notable people with the surname include:

 Charles Luxton (1861–1918), English clergyman and cricketer
 Charlie Luxton (born 1974), architectural designer and television presenter
 Jack Luxton (1923-2005), dairy farmer
 Jo Luxton, New Zealand politician
 John Luxton (born 1946), former New Zealand National Party politician
 Norman Luxton (1876–1962), son of William F. Luxton and known as “Mr. Banff”
 William F. Luxton (1844–1907), Canadian teacher, newspaper editor and publisher, politician, and office holder

See also
 Luxton School, a school in Winnipeg, Canada
 On the Buses, British television sitcom, 1969 to 1973, set in the fictional town of Luxton